Henry Howard, 2nd Earl of Effingham, DL (23 August 1806 – 5 February 1889), styled Lord Howard from 1837 to 1845, was a British peer and Member of Parliament.

Background and education
Howard was the eldest son of General Kenneth Howard, 1st Earl of Effingham, from his first marriage to Lady Charlotte Primrose, daughter of Neil Primrose, 3rd Earl of Rosebery. He was educated at Harrow.

Military and political career
Howard was commissioned an ensign in the 58th (Rutlandshire) Regiment of Foot on 21 July 1825, and a lieutenant on 14 May 1826. On 9 November 1830, he became a captain in the 10th (North Lincoln) Regiment of Foot, resigning his commission on 29 November 1833. He was elected to the House of Commons for Shaftesbury in 1841, a seat he held until 1845, when he succeeded his father in the earldom and entered the House of Lords. On 17 February 1845, he was appointed a deputy lieutenant of Wiltshire, and on 14 March 1853, a deputy lieutenant of the West Riding of Yorkshire.

Family
Lord Effingham married Eliza Drummond, daughter of General Sir Gordon Drummond, in 1832. They had several children:

Hon. Blanche Eliza Howard (16 June 1834 – 1840).
Lady Maria Howard (3 August 1835 – 14 January 1928).
Henry Howard, 3rd Earl of Effingham (1837–1898).
Capt. Hon. Frederick Charles Howard (21 June 1840 – 26 October 1893), married on 3 June 1871 Lady Constance Eleanora Caroline, daughter of George Finch-Hatton, 11th Earl of Winchilsea, and had issue:
Gordon Howard, 5th Earl of Effingham (1873–1946).
Capt. Hon. Algernon George Mowbray Frederick Howard (15 September 1874 – 7 May 1950).
Lady Alice Howard (8 March 1843 – 27 November 1932).
Hon. Kenneth Howard (14 June 1845 – 21 January 1903), clerk in the Foreign Office.

He died in February 1889, aged 82, and was succeeded in the earldom by his eldest son Henry. The Countess of Effingham died in February 1894.

References 
 Kidd, Charles, Williamson, David (editors). Debrett's Peerage and Baronetage (1990 edition). New York: St Martin's Press, 1990.
 
 www.thepeerage.com

External links 
 

1806 births
1889 deaths
19th-century British Army personnel
Deputy Lieutenants of the West Riding of Yorkshire
Deputy Lieutenants of Wiltshire
Earls in the Peerage of the United Kingdom
Henry Howard, 02nd Earl of Effingham
Howard, Henry Howard, Lord
People educated at Harrow School
Northamptonshire Regiment officers
Royal Lincolnshire Regiment officers
Howard, Henry Howard, Lord
UK MPs who inherited peerages
Earls of Effingham
Barons Howard of Effingham